Shirley is an American comedy-drama television series that aired on NBC from October 26, 1979 until January 25, 1980.

Premise
A recent widow moves from a big city to a small town with her three children, her stepson and her housekeeper.

Cast
Shirley Jones as Shirley Miller
Patrick Wayne as Lew Armitage
Peter Barton as Bill Miller
Rosanna Arquette as Debra Miller
Bret Shryer as Hemm Miller
Tracey Gold as Michelle Miller
John McIntire as Dutch McHenry
Ann Doran as Charlotte McHenry
Cindy Eilbacher as Tracey McCord

Episodes

References

External links
 

1979 American television series debuts
1980 American television series endings
1970s American comedy-drama television series
1980s American comedy-drama television series
English-language television shows
NBC original programming
Television series by Universal Television
Television shows set in California